There have been many  criticisms of econometrics' usefulness as a discipline and perceived widespread methodological shortcomings in econometric modelling practices.

Difficulties in model specification 
Like other forms of statistical analysis, badly specified econometric models may show a spurious correlation where two variables are correlated but causally unrelated. Economist Ronald Coase is widely reported to have said "if you torture the data long enough it will confess". McCloskey argues that in published econometric work, economists tend to rely excessively on statistical techniques and often fail to use economic reasoning for including or excluding variables.

Economic variables are not readily isolated for experimental testing, but Edward Leamer argues that there is no essential difference between econometric analysis and randomized trials or controlled trials provided judicious use of statistical techniques eliminates the effects of collinearity between the variables.

Economists are often faced with a high number of often highly collinear potential explanatory variables, leaving researcher bias to play an important role in their selection. Leamer argues that economists can mitigate this by running statistical tests with different specified models and discarding any inferences which prove to be "fragile", concluding that "professionals ... properly withhold belief until an inference can be shown to be adequately insensitive to the choice of assumptions". However, as Sala-I-Martin showed, it is often the case that you can specify two models suggesting contrary relation between two variables. The phenomenon was labeled 'emerging recalcitrant result' phenomenon by Robert Goldfarb.

Lucas critique 

Robert Lucas criticised the use of overly simplistic econometric models of the macroeconomy to predict the implications of economic policy, arguing that the structural relationships observed in historical models break down if decision makers adjust their preferences to reflect policy changes. Lucas argued that policy conclusions drawn from contemporary large-scale macroeconometric models were invalid as economic actors would change their expectations of the future and adjust their behaviour accordingly.

Lucas argued a good macroeconometric model should incorporate microfoundations to model the effects of policy change, with equations representing economic representative agents responding to economic changes based on rational expectations of the future; implying their pattern of behaviour might be quite different if economic policy changed.

Modern complex econometric models tend to be designed with the Lucas critique and rational expectations in mind, but Robert Solow argued that some of these modern dynamic stochastic general equilibrium models were no better as the assumptions they made about economic behaviour at the micro level were "generally phony".

Other mainstream critiques 
Looking primarily at macroeconomics, Lawrence Summers has criticized econometric formalism, arguing that "the empirical facts of which we are most confident and which provide the most secure basis for theory are those that require the least sophisticated statistical analysis to perceive." He looks at two highly praised macroeconometric studies (Hansen & Singleton (1982, 1983), and Bernanke (1986)), and argues that while both make brilliant use of econometric methods, both papers do not really prove anything that future theory can build on. Noting that in the natural sciences, "investigators rush to check out the validity of claims made by rival laboratories and then build on them," Summers points out that this rarely happen in economics, which to him is a result of the fact that "the results [of econometric studies] are rarely an important input to theory creation or the evolution of professional opinion more generally." To Summers:

Austrian School critique 
The current-day Austrian School of economics typically rejects econometrics, stating that historical mathematical data used to make econometric models represents past behaviour which may change in future and is ineffective at isolating causal relationships. In this they continue their belief that mathematics and statistical methods are mostly unsuited for the study of social sciences.

See also 
 Econometrics
 Methodology of econometrics
 Macroeconomic model
 History of macroeconomic thought

Notes

Econometrics
Econometrics